Obi is a Local Government Area in Nasarawa State, Nigeria. Its headquarters are in the town of Obi. it other towns include Adudu Emirate, Agwatashi, Daddare, Jenkwe, Duduguru, Agyaragu, Tudun Adabu, Gude, and Riri.

It has an area of 967 km and a population of 148,874 at the 2006 census.

The postal code of the area is 951.

References

Local Government Areas in Nasarawa State